The Exploration Upper Stage (EUS) is being developed as a large second stage for Block 1B and Block 2 of the Space Launch System (SLS), succeeding Block 1's Interim Cryogenic Propulsion Stage. The EUS is expected to first fly on Artemis IV in 2027.

Development 
The Block 1 configuration of SLS has a core stage powered by four RS-25 engines, two Space Shuttle-derived five-segment solid rocket boosters, and an Interim Cryogenic Propulsion Stage (ICPS) upper stage.

NASA will develop the EUS to increase SLS performance beyond Block 1 specifications. The improved upper stage was originally named the Dual Use Upper Stage (DUUS, pronounced "duce") but was later renamed the Exploration Upper Stage (EUS) due to DUUS sounding like a profanity in Japanese.

In 2014, NASA announced that it would proceed with development of Block 1B with the EUS and would use it on EM-2. In April 2016, it was reported that NASA has chosen to use a design based on four RL10-C3 engines for the EUS, and in October 2016 NASA confirmed they had ordered 10 of the engines.

In 2018, it was decided to optimise EUS for payload to lunar missions, by using smaller tanks.

By February 2020, the development contract for EUS had been delayed, and NASA was planning to use ICPS for the first three launches of SLS.

Boeing announced on 21 December 2020 that the Exploration Upper Stage (EUS) of the SLS completed a critical design review (CDR) with NASA. That review confirmed the design of the EUS, allowing Boeing to proceed with development of the stage, including hardware fabrication.

Funding History

Cost concerns and alternatives
Due to the possible cost of EUS (about US$800 million each), NASA invited proposals for alternatives, but in May 2019 rejected Blue Origin's proposal. NASA ordered eight EUSs from Boeing.

See also 
 Delta Cryogenic Second Stage
 Earth Departure Stage

Notes

References 

Space Launch System
Rocket stages